A Witches' Sabbath is a legendary ritual associated with witchcraft.

Witches' Sabbath may also refer to:
 Witches' Sabbath (Goya, 1798), a painting by Goya
 Witches' Sabbath (The Great He-Goat), an 1823 painting by Goya
 Witches' Sabbath (novel), by Paula Allardyce, 1961

See also
 Black Sabbath (disambiguation)